The 1903–04 Scottish Division One season was won by Third Lanark by four points over nearest rival Hearts. The top division of Scottish football expanded from 12 to 14 teams, and Airdrieonians and Motherwell joined the division having finished first and second in Division Two the previous season.

League table

Results

References

Scottish Football Archive

1903–04 Scottish Football League
Scottish Division One seasons
Scottish